Nodosa Shipyard is a shipyard dedicated to the construction, modification and repair of all kinds of metal hull vessels of up to 150 meters length, as well as general industrial manufacturing.

Located in the Galicia region, in northwest Spain, the shipyard currently has three operational centers working in the province of Pontevedra. These consist of a factory in the parish of Bueu, the yard and repair center in the Marin Port Authority sited in the homonymous parish, and the workshop located in the city of Pontevedra, which is the provincial capital.

History 

Nodosa Shipyard was born over 40 years ago as an auxiliary company in the metal industry. In 1982 inaugurates its metalworking shops and in the early 90s acquires the concession of a small dock. After successive stages of growth and expansion, the first one becomes the current factory and the head office, and the second one in the today's shipyard. Other workshops have been added in parallel, as the mechanical workshop (Nodosafer).

On January 19, 2015, the company formalized the acquisition of Factoria Naval de Marin shipyard (FNM), which includes both facilities and the granting of land use, and also the property over the historical shipbuilder and its brand Marin Luxury Yachts names.

Marine division 

Dedicated exclusively to shipbuilding and shiprepair of steel hull vessels.

The shipyard builds mainly tugs and maritime assistance vessels, dredgers and port workboats as pontoons, barges and lighters. It also builds cargo ships (multipurpose), tankers, offshore vessels and fish boats as tuna fishing vessels, longliners, trawlers, purse seiners or auxiliary vessels for aquaculture and trap.

The construction of fishing vessels gave rise to the company, thanks to a geographical linkage to a seafaring region as the Rías Baixas, Galicia, where fishing represents one of the most important economic activities. 
Furthermore, Galician community, is one of the world's major power in the field of aquaculture.

Other shipbuildings included submarines of different capabilities that allow passengers to view the seabed, passenger vessels for commercial and tourist routes, sailboats of different dimensions, yachts, megayachts, merchant vessels, tankers, any kind of carrying vessel, platforms support and rescue vessels and other offshore vessels, ferries or any other kind of boats.

Turnkey manufacturing is another important area in the company. Nodosa covers works commissioned by other shipyards, whether they are logistics services, cutting or material forming; producing blocks; carrying out any of the stages in shipbuilding: hull, superstructure, fitting out, piping.

The shipyard performs repair, modernization and conversion of ships, conducted both in its facilities and afloat. As for significant figures, the average values by type of repair in the period 2001-2013 are shown below:

 Sleepway repairs average: 86.62
 Afloat repairs average: 48.38
 Total repairs average: 135

Industrial Division

Industrial Division has gradually diversified into different sectors, such as manufacturing and ship repair, maintenance and industrial fitting, manufacture of metal structures for construction, it also produced different elements related to such traditional sectors as the granite, timber and catching sectors, or to such leading edge fields as wind power and aeronautics.

The company has an independent mechanical workshop, which has specialized machinery for work and machine different parts used in the shipyard or in other outside companies.

Finally, the company has carried out works of design, manufacture and assembly in different industrial sectors.

It has a 18,000 m2 logistic capability, which allows storage of up to 3,000 tons of material. The shipyard can carry, cut and shape materials such as steel and aluminum alloys in different quality grades, thicknesses and sizes, for later assembly at the client projects or delivering the final product.

Finally, the company makes engineering developments for chemical, mining, gas and oil, shipbuilding, aeronautical, wind and railway sectors. Also for granite industry, wood or for different areas such as art, where the shipyard has actively collaborated with the madrilenian sculptor Carlos Albert.

Ships built at Nodosa Shipyard (selection) 

Below are the most relevant constructions carried out by Nodosa.

See also 
 List of shipbuilders and shipyards
 Shipbuilding
 Shiprepair

References

External links 
 Nodosa Shipyard website
 Shipyard Dredgers website
 Shipyard Tugs website
 Shipbuilding and Shiprepair website

Shipyards of Spain